Organization of the Kwantung Army which was an army group of the Imperial Japanese Army of Japan.

The following are commanders and units of the Japanese army which was stationed in the Kwantung peninsula of Manchuria from 1910 to 1945.

Officers attached to Kwantung Army HQ
Hatazō Adachi:- Attached to HQ, Kwantung Army
Kenji Doihara:- Attached to HQ, Kwantung Army (MajGen)
Kiichiro Higuchi:- Attached to HQ, Kwantung Army (MajGen)
Harukichi Hyakutake:- Attached to HQ, Kwantung Army
Masatane Kanda:- Attached to Kwantung Army HQ, Officer, Kwantung Army HQ
Renya Mutaguchi:- Assigned to Kwantung Army HQ (MajGen)
Hidemitsu Nakano:- HQ, Kwantung Army
Takuma Shimoyama:- Attached to Kwantung Army
Jun Ushiroku:- Attached to Kwantung Army HQ
Isamu Yokoyama:- Attached to Kwantung Army HQ
Shizuo Yokoyama:- (Colonel), assigned to Kwantung Army HQ
Seishirō Itagaki:- Attached to same army (MajGen)

Kwantung Army Railroad Service Commanders
Hatazō Adachi:- Commander, Kwantung Army Railroad Command
Shizuo Yokoyama:- Member, Railway Sector HQ, Kwantung Army, Commander, same Sector HQ

Officers attached to Kwantung Government-General Service
Sadao Araki:- Officer, Kwantung Government-General
Koiso Kuniaki:- Army Staff Officer, Kwantung Government
Jun Ushiroku:- Assigned to Kwantung Government-General

Deputy Chief of Kwantung Army Staff
Kitsuju Ayabe:- Deputy Chief of Staff, Kwantung Army (MajGen)
Hitoshi Imamura:- Deputy Chief of Staff, Kwantung Army
Seichiro Itagaki:- Deputy-Chief of Staff, same army
Yasuji Okamura:- Deputy Chief of Staff, Kwantung Army
Hitoshi Imamura: Deputy Chief of Staff Kwantung Army, Manchuria
Kanji Ishiwara: Deputy Chief of Staff Kwantung Army, Manchuria

Chiefs of Kwantung Army Staff
Hikosaburo Hata: Chief of Staff Kwantung Army, Manchuria
Heitarō Kimura:- Chief of Staff, Kwantung Army
Jo Iimura:- Chief of Staff, Kwantung Army
Kanji Ishiwara:- Chief of Staff, Kwantung Army
Koiso Kuniaki:- General, Chief of Staff, Kwantung Army
Toshizō Nishio:- Chief of Staff, Kwantung Army
Rensuke Isogaya:- Chief of Staff, Kwantung Army
Hideki Tōjō:- Chief of Staff, Kwantung Army

Members of Kwantung Army Staff
Kitsuju Ayabe:- Staff Officer, Kwantung Army, engaged in Chahar area operation
Takushiro Hattori:- Staff Officer (Operations), Kwantung Army Headquarters (LtCol)
Kanji Ishiwara:- Staff Officer, Kwantung Army
Seishirō Itagaki:- Staff Officer, Kwantung Army
Torashirō Kawabe:- Staff Officer (Operations; Intelligence), Kwantung Army
Seiichi Kita:- Staff Officer, Kwantung Army
Takeshi Mori:- Staff Officer, Kwantung Army
Akira Mutō:- staff officer, Kwantung Army
Sōsaku Suzuki:- Staff Officer, Kwantung Army
Sinichi Tanaka:- Staff Officer, Kwantung Army
Kioji Tominaga:- Staff Officer, Kwantung Army
Masanobu Tsuji:- Staff Officer (Operations), Kwantung Army (Major), during Nomonhan Incident
Rikichi Tsukada:- Staff Officer, Kwantung Army

Kwantung Army Commanders (regular Army)
Kōtoku Satō:- during Nomonhan Incident in 1939 he led the 2nd Sector Unit, 8th Border Garrison Unit (Hailar). Then a Major General, he replaced the wounded commanding general of the 23rd Infantry' Group on the Nomonhan battle front
Michitarō Komatsubara:- Chief of 23d Division, and Japanese Commander in Nomonhan Incident
Kitsuju Ayabe:- Chief of Staff, First Area Army (Manchuria), Kwantung Army, North China Detachment, Staff Officer, Third Army (Manchuria)
Jo Iimura:- Commanding General, Fifth Army (Manchuria)
Kenzo Kitano:- Hunchun Garrison Commander (Manchuria)
Seiichi Kita:- Commanding General, First Area Army (Manchuria)
Masutaro Nakai:- Commander assigned to Manchuria Independent Garrison Unit
Korechika Anami:- Second Area Army Commander (Qiqihar, Manchuria)
Nobuyoshi Obata:- Chief of Staff, Forty-fourth Army (Manchuria)
Jun Ushiroku:- Third Area Army Commander, Manchuria
Otozō Yamada:- 12th Division Commander (Dongning, Manchuria), Commanding General, Third Army (Mudanjiang, Manchuria)
Isamu Chō: Commanding Officer 74th Regiment, Manchuria
Noritsune Shimizu:- Lieutenant General, commander of Fifth Army (Mudanjiang)
Keisaku Murakami:- Commander in Third Army (Yanji)
Mikio Uemura:- Chief in Fourth Army (Qiqihar)
Shōjirō Iida:- Commander of Thirtieth Army (Changchun)
Yoshio Hongo:- Forty-Four Army (Liaoyuan)
Kioji Tominaga:- 139th Division Commander (organized in Manchuria)
Tomoyuki Yamashita:- Led First Area Army (with HQ in Mudanjiang)
Yoshio Kozuki:- Commanded Second Army (Yanji)
Jo Iimura: General Officer Commanding 5th Army, Manchuria
Shin Yoshida:- Led Mechanized Army with HQ in Sipingjie
Kitsuju Ayabe: Deputy Chief of Staff 3rd Army, Manchuria, Chief of Staff Kwantung Army and Chief of Staff 1st Area Army, Manchuria
Shōjirō Iida: General Officer Commanding 30th Army, Manchuria and General Officer Commanding 20th Army, Manchuria
Masaki Honda: General Officer Commanding 8th Division, Manchuria
Tamio Iwasaki: General Officer Commanding 111th Division, Manchuria
Torajiro Iwai: General Officer Commanding 108th Division, Manchuria
Sadao Inoue: General Officer Commanding 14th Division, Manchuria
Shunkichi Ikeda: General Officer Commanding 35th Division, Manchuria
Yoshio Hongo: General Officer Commanding 62nd Division, Manchuria and General Officer Commanding 44th Army, Manchuria
Hidezo Hitomi: General Officer Commanding 12th Division, Manchuria
Mamoru Hara: General Officer Commanding 9th Division, Manchuria
Koichi Abe: General Officer Commanding 107th Division, Manchuria
Shojikiro Amaya: General Officer Commanding 40th Division, Manchuria
Tatsumi Amamiya: General Officer Commanding 24th Division, Manchuria
Keiichi Arikawa: Commanding Officer Infantry Group 62nd Division, Manchuria

Kwantung Army Commander of Engineer Unit
Shozo Hirano: Commanding Officer 2nd Engineer Unit, Manchuria

Commander of 1st Special Tank Company in Harbin (1932) and Rehe (1933)
Captain Hyakutake:- Commander of 1st Special Tank Company during Harbin fight (Manchurian Incident) in 1932 and Rehe battle in 1933.

Commander of Yasuoka Task Force (armored group) in Nomonhan Incident (1939)
Yasuoka Masaomi:- Commander of Yasuoka Task Force. Between your units stayed the 3rd Tank Regiment, led by Colonel Yoshimaru and 4th Tank Regiment led for Colonel Tamada

Commander of 2nd Tank Group (Division) (Manchukuo)
Tasuku Okada:- Commander, 2nd Tank Group (Division) "Geki", Manchukuo

Commander of 1st Tank Brigade and 1st Armored Division
Koreo Hosomi: Commanding Officer 1st Tank Brigade, Manchuria
Toshimoto Hoshinato: General Officer Commanding 1st Armored Division, Manchuria

Commander of 1st Garrison Unit of Kwantung Army
Yoshio Ishino: Commanding Officer 1st Garrison Unit, Manchuria

Chief of Staff, Kwantung Defense Army
Nobuyoshi Obata:- Kwantung Army, Chief of Staff, Kwantung Defense Army
Tomoyuki Yamashita:- Commanding General, Kwantung Army Defense Army
Nobuyushi Muto: Commander in Chief Kwantung Army Defense Army

Kwantung Army Commander-in-Chief
Yoshinori Shirakawa: Commander in Chief Kwantung Army
Kenachi Ueda: Commander in Chief Kwantung Army
Taka Hishikari: Commander in Chief Kwantung Army
Shigeru Honjō:- Commander of Kwantung Army
Yoshitake Muraoka:- Commander of Kwantung Army
Nobuyushi Muto: Commander in Chief Kwantung Army
Senjuro Hayashi:- Commander of Kwantung Army
Jirō Minami:- Commanding General, Kwantung Army
Koiso Kuniaki:- Commander of Kwantung Army
Kenkichi Ueda:- Commander of Kwantung Army
Yoshijirō Umezu:- Commanding General, Kwantung Army, Commander-in-Chief, same army
Otozō Yamada:- Commander-in-Chief, Kwantung Army

Kwantung Army Commander of Port Arthur
Saburo Ando: Commandant of Port Arthur

Quartermaster-General Kwantung Army
Lieutenant-General Furuno: Quartermaster-General Kwantung Army, Manchuria

Commander of Kempeitai units, Kwantung Army
Keisuke Fujie:- Chief, General Affairs Bureau, Military Police, HQ, Kwantung Army, Commander, Kwantung Army Military Police
Shizuichi Tanaka:- Commander, Kwantung Army Military Police Units
Hideki Tōjō:- Commanding General, Military Police, Kwantung Army
Saburo Shimomura:- General of Japanese Gendarmerie section, Kempeitai detachment in Xinjing

Kwantung Army Chief of Manchu Secret Police
Toranosuke Hashimoto: Commanding Officer Manchu Secret Police, Xinjing, Manchuria (as branch of Kempeitain Intelligence in Manchukuo)

Kwantung Army experts in Strike South planning
Yoshihide Hayashi, Chief of Staff Unit 82 (Strike South planning), Manchuria
Isamu Chō, Vice Chief of Staff Unit 82 (Strike South planning), Manchuria

Commander in Kwantung Special Intelligence Service
Prince Tsuneyoshi Takeda:- Occult Commander-in-Chief of Japanese Secret Services in Manchukuo; also Imperial Family Liaison with Kwantung Army and Kempeitai Intelligence Services in land
Torashirō Kawabe:- Staff Officer (Operations; Intelligence), Kwantung Army
Kingoro Hashimoto:- Chief, Special Service Agency, Hailar, Kwantung Army
Michitarō Komatsubara:- Chief of the Special Service Agency at Harbin, Kwantung Army
Koiso Kuniaki:- concurrently Chief, Special Service Department, Kwantung Army
Nobuyoshi Obata:- Chief, Harbin Special Intelligence Agency, Kwantung Army
Tadashi Hanaya: Head of Special Services Agency Kwantung Army
Seikichi Hyakatuke: Head Harbin Special Services Agency, Manchuria
Kenji Doihara: Head Special Service Agency Kwantung Army
Shun Akifusa Chief of military Mission in Harbin and political adviser to the white Russian political groups in same city
Genzo Yanagita head of the Japanese military mission in Harbin
Kenji Ishikawa head of a sabotage group of that mission
Yutaka Takeoka intelligence officer and head of the Dairen military mission
Saburo Asada head of the 2nd (Intelligence) department of the staff of the Kwantung Army
Tamaki Kumazaki deputy chief of intelligence of Kwantung Army
Hiroki Nohara deputy chief of Kwantung Army Intelligence
Yoshio Itagaki deputy chief of Kwantung Army Intelligence and son of Seishiro Itagaki, war minister from 1938–1939
Norihiro Yasue, Army officer, author of the Fugu Plan
Koreshige Inuzuka, Navy officer, co-author of the Fugu Plan
Konstantin Vladimirovich Rodzaevsky, White Russian anticommunist leader
General Kislitsin, another White Russian anticommunist chief
Genrikh Lyushkov, ex-Soviet Far East NKVD defector, adviser to Kwantung Army

Commanders of the Imperial Japanese Army Air Service forces in the Kwantung Army
Torashirō Kawabe:- Commanding General, 7th Air Brigade (Manchuria), Commanding General, Second Air Army (Manchuria)
Captain Kamata:- commander of Kwantung Army Hane Air Unit

Air Squadrons of Kwantung Army and Manchukuoan Air Force

Kwantung Army Air units
2nd Air Division
2nd Air Brigade
8th Air Brigade
9th Air Brigade
13th Air Brigade
29th Air Brigade
28th Independent Regiment

Combat Units
15th Sentai
104th Sentai
25th Sentai
81st Sentai
Hane Air Unit
5th Sentai (with base in Hebei, fighting against Soviets probably in Chahar, Mengjiang area)

Training Units (also was operative used in combat)
101st Sentai
4th Sentai
13th Sentai
22nd Sentai
23rd Sentai
26th Sentai
42nd Sentai
24th Sentai
5th Sentai

Manchoukouan Air Units
1st Air Group
2nd Air Group
3rd Air Group
Training Air Group

Chief and Instructors in Kwantung Army Training Schools
Kenzo Kitano:- Commandant, Kungchuling Army School (Manchuria)
Kioji Tominaga:- Commandant, Kungchuling Army Tank School (Manchuria)

Operative units in Kwantung Army Training Schools
1st Tank Army (Main Tank instruction unit)
23rd Tank Regiment (Practice Tank unit)
24th Tank Regiment (Practice Tank unit)

Japanese Official Ambassador to Manchukuo
Jirō Minami:- Kwantung Army - concurrently Ambassador to Manchukuo
Taka Hishikari:- Kwantung Army - Ambassador to Manchukuo
Tadashi Hanaya:- Head, Japanese Military Mission Manchukuo
Shun Akifusa:- Head, Harbin Military Mission

Adviser in Manchukuoan Military Administration Bureau
Takuma Shimoyama:-Headquarters-Adviser, Manchukuoan Military Administration Bureau

Officers in Kwantung Frontier Guards detachment
Shun Akifusa: Commanding Officer 4th Border Garrison Unit Manchuria
N.Imoto:- Kwantung Army Frontier Guard officer in service in Hiriyahari detachment HQ, no far less of frontier point N°25 in upper lands of Usachi River, in front at Komissarsky, in Soviet Side, Manchu-Russian frontier
Captain Ohki:- Commander, Artillery Unit/15th Border Guard Unit in Kotou Fortress located near Ussuri River in the Soviet-Manchurian border
Kōtoku Satō:- During Nomonhan Incident in 1939 he led the 2nd Sector Unit, 8th Border Garrison Unit (Hailar, Hsingan)
Ilasebe Riei:- Commander, 8th Border Guards unit

Participants in Changkufeng Incident (1938)
Kōtoku Satō COL - During the Zhanggufeng Incident in 1938, commanded the 75th Infantry Regiment

Participants in Nomonhan Incident (1939)
Aoyagi Kinichiro  CPT - Commander, 5th Company, 2/28th Battalion
Azuma Shoji  LTC - Acting Commander, 71st Infantry Regiment
Azuma Yaozo  LTC - Commander, Reconnaissance Element, 23d Division
Ilasebe Riei  COL - Commander, 8th Border Guards
Hattori Takushiro  LTC - Staff Officer, Kwantung Army
Kajikawa Romiji  MAJ - Commander, 2/28th Battalion
Komatsubara Michitaro  LTG - Commander, 23rd Infantry Division
Morita Tetsuji  COL - Commander, 71st Infantry Regiment
Muranaka Shoichi  1LT - Aide-de-camp, Commander, 2/28th Battalion
Nagano Eizo  COL - Commander, 71st Infantry Regiment
Nakano Tomizo  2LT - Commander, 1st Platoon, 6th Company, 2/28th Bn
Nishinome Shogoro  2LT - Commander, 2nd Platoon, 6th Company, 2/28th Bn
Ogisu Rippei  LTG - Commander, 6th Army
Sadakaji Tetsuo  1LT - Commander, Machine Can Company, 2/28th Btn
Saito Kiyokichi  1LT - Commander, 7th Company, 2/28th Btn
Sano Shoji  2LT - Commander, id Platoon, 5th Company, 2/28th Btn
Sawada Tetsuro  1LT - Commander, Weapons Platoon, 5th Company, 2/ 28th
Sumi Shinichiro  COL - Commander, 26th Infantry Regiment  Relieved
Suzuki Katsushi  2LT - Commander, 3rd Platoon, 7th Company, 2/28th Ed
Tahara Tamotsu  2LT - Commander, 1st Platoon, 5th Company, 2/28th Bn
Tokushima Masao  2LT - Commander, 2nd Platoon, 7th Company, 2/28th Bn
Tsuji Kiichi  CPT - Commander, 6th Company, 2/28th Bn
Tsuji Masanobu  MAJ - Staff Officer, Kwantung Army
Ueda Kenachi  GEN - Commander, Kwantung Army
Yamagata Takemitsu  COL - Commander, 64th Infantry Regiment
Yasuoka Masaomi  LTG - Commander, Yasuoka Task Force
Colonel Yoshimaru - Commander of 3rd Tank Regiment, in the Yasuoka Task Force
Colonel Tamada - Commander of 4th Tank Regiment in the Yasuoka Task Force
Col. Ise - Commander of 13th Field Artillery Regiment
Major Gen. Hata - Commander of 3rd Field Heavy Artillery Brigade HQ
Col. Mishima - Commander of 1st Field Heavy Artillery Regiment
Col. Takatsukasa - Commander of 7th Independent Field Heavy Artillery Regiment
Lt. Col. Someya - Commander of Muling Heavy Artillery Regiment
Col. Miyao - Commander of 1st Independent Field Artillery Regiment
1st Lt. Hitoshi Asano - twenty-two-victory IJAAF air ace against the Russians in Nomonhan

Organization of Manchukuoan Fortresses
Referring to defensive fortifications on the Russian-Manchu frontier line, this organization was led from Xinjing Fortress Command in the Manchoukoan capital, under the command of the Kwantung Army Commander.

The Kwantung Army laid plans for a border defense system in 1934, but construction work did not begin until 1935. During the early period (to 1938), four zones were fortified in East Manchuria, plus three in the north and one in the west.

Manzhouli fortified district
Kotou fortified district
Fuyuan fortified district
Sungari fortified district and Japanese Army Sungari Flotilla
Xinjing fortified district/defense center
Tuntsiang defense center
Fuqing fortified district with five permanent emplacements, a munitions depot and six mortar batteries
Sun’u fortified district with 20,000 Japanese officers and soldiers
Sanjiang fortified district

Kwantung Fortifications
These fortresses were in direct command of the Kwantung Army in the territory; also included Japanese Navy detachments in Dairen and Ryojun naval bases.

Port Arthur fortified district (now Liaoshun)
Dairen fortified district (now Dalian)
Ryojun fortified district (now Lushun)

Japanese Navy detachments in Kwantung Area

Ryojun Naval Station (Kwantung)
H.Ukita Commander of Ryojun Naval Guard District and Station; also the Japanese Navy's highest authority in Kwantung area, responsible for these units:
Ryojun Naval Base HQ
Ryojun Signal Unit
Ryojun Base Defense Unit
Ryojun Base Military Police
Ryojun Naval Barracks Service
Ryojun Port Duty Unit

50th Minesweeper Division (Ryojun)
R.Kurosaki Commander of 50th Minesweeper Division (Ryojun); under his leadership were these units:
Shanan Maru N 16
? Maru

Commanders and members of Unit 731
Shiro Ishii:-was founder of Unit 731 in Manchukuo
Ryoichi Naito
Masaji Kitano
Yoshio Shinozuka
Barone Ottavio

Commander and members of Unit 100
Yujiro Wakamatsu:-commander of Unit 100 in Changchung
Kazuo Mitomo
Officer Matsui
Officer Hirazakura
Officer Kuwabara

Others similar units under Japanese Army Command
Unit 516
Unit 1855
Unit 2646
Unit 8604
Unit 9420
Unit Ei 1644

Operative units in Kwangtung Theatre Army
January 1937 to July 1937:
 1st, 2nd, 4th, 12th Divisions
 1st, 11th Independent Mixed Brigades
 1st, 2nd, 3rd, 4th, 5th Independent Garrisons
 the Cavalry Group
 IJA 3rd Cavalry Brigade
 Kwangtung Army Flight Group
 10th, 11th, 12th, 15th, 16th Air Regiments

Direct Reporting Units
10th Infantry Division
28th Infantry Division
29th Infantry Division
23rd Tank Regiment
Botanko Artillery Regiment
3rd Signal Regiment
Kwangtung Air Brigade

3rd Army
9th Infantry Division
12th Infantry Division
57th Infantry Division
1st Tank Brigade
7th Artillery Command
5th Separate Engineer Regiment
9th Separate Engineer Regiment
27th Separate Engineer Regiment
33rd Truck Brigade
49th Truck Brigade
66th Truck Brigade
67th Truck Brigade

4th Army
1st Infantry Division
44th Truck Brigade
68th Truck Brigade
5th Army
11th Infantry Division
24th Infantry Division
2nd Armored Brigade
8th Artillery Brigade
7th Separate Engineer Regiment
22nd Separate Engineer Regiment
23rd Separate Engineer Regiment
69th Truck Regiment
70th Truck Regiment

6th Army
14th Infantry Division
23rd Infantry Division
4th Signal Regiment
47th Truck Brigade
20th Army
8th Infantry Division
25th Infantry Division
5th Artillery Brigade
34th Truck Brigade
64th Truck Brigade

1st Armored Group (Division)
Nickname: "Taku" (Development)
Formed in December 1941 in Poli, Manchuria. Renamed a Division in June 1942.
1st Tank Regiment
3rd Tank Regiment
5th Tank Regiment
9th Tank Regiment

2nd Armored Group (Division)
Nickname: "Geki" (Hit)
Formed in December 1941 in Mutangchiang, Manchuria. Renamed a Division in June 1942.
6th Tank Regiment
7th Tank Regiment
10th Tank Regiment
11th Tank Regiment

References

Imperial Japanese Army